Within the French nobility, the title of "Prince of Soubise" was created in 1667 when the sirerie of Soubise, Charente-Maritime was raised to a principality for the cadet branch of the House of Rohan. The first prince was François de Rohan (1630-1712). He was succeeded by three further princes before the male line of Rohan-Soubise became extinct upon the death of the second Duke of Rohan-Rohan, Charles (1715-87).

See also
Princess of Soubise

References and notes

House of Rohan
Princes of Soubise
Princesses of Soubise